World Magshimey Herut, is a Zionist young adult movement founded in 1999 by a group of Jewish activists based on the ideals of aliyah, social justice and the Land of Israel. The headquarters of the movement are located in Israel.

History 

When a Likud government led by Prime Minister Benjamin Netanyahu relinquished parts of Hebron to Yasser Arafat in 1998, Betar (the youth movement most associated with the Likud) members had conflicting views with the Prime Minister. In reaction to the Prime Minister's decision, the Director of Overseas Activities at the time, Karma Feinstein-Cohen, along with a group of ideological purists and veteran activists from chapters throughout the world, left Betar in order to establish a new movement.

Today the movement has active members in 11 countries.

See also
 Revisionist Zionism
Ze'ev Jabotinsky
Herut – The National Movement

References

External links
 World Magshimey Herut Official website

Jewish political organizations
Youth organizations based in Israel
Zionist youth movements
Political organizations based in Israel
Student political organizations
Organizations established in 1999
Revisionist Zionism
1999 establishments in Israel